Abajah is a village in Imo State, Nigeria. It is in the Nwangele Local Government Area.

The village is the location of a nine-meter-high statue, Jesus de Greatest.

References 

Towns in Imo State